The 1959 Central Michigan Chippewas football team represented Central Michigan University in the Interstate Intercollegiate Athletic Conference (IIAC) during the 1959 NCAA College Division football season.  In their ninth season under head coach Kenneth Kelly, the Chippewas compiled a 7–3 record (4–2 against IIAC opponents) and outscored their opponents by a combined total of 233 to 155.

The team's statistical leaders included Oarie Lemanski with 962 passing yards and Jerry O'Neil with 821 rushing yards and 296 receiving yards. Halfback Walter Beach received the team's most valuable player award for the second consecutive year. No Central Michigan players received first-team honors on the All-IIAC team.

Schedule

References

Central Michigan
Central Michigan Chippewas football seasons
Central Michigan Chippewas football